John Black (26 October 1882 – 16 October 1924) was a Canadian sports shooter. He was born in Coylton in South Ayrshire, Scotland. Competing for Canada, he won a silver medal in team clay pigeons at the 1924 Summer Olympics in Paris. He also competed at the 1920 Summer Olympics.

He died at Winnipeg General Hospital on 16 October 1924.

References

1882 births
1924 deaths
Sportspeople from South Ayrshire
Canadian male sport shooters
Olympic shooters of Canada
Olympic silver medalists for Canada
Shooters at the 1920 Summer Olympics
Shooters at the 1924 Summer Olympics
Medalists at the 1924 Summer Olympics
Olympic medalists in shooting
20th-century Canadian people
British emigrants to Canada